This is a list of Tamil national-type primary schools (SJK(T)) in Selangor, Malaysia. As of June 2022, there are 99 Tamil primary schools with a total of 26,393 students.

List of Tamil national-type primary schools in Selangor

Klang District

Kuala Langat District

Kuala Selangor District

Hulu Langat District

Hulu Selangor District

Sabak Bernam District

Gombak District

Petaling District

Sepang District

See also 

 Tamil primary schools in Malaysia
 Lists of Tamil national-type primary schools in Malaysia

References

Schools in Selangor
Selangor
selangor